Czas honoru (English: Days of Honour) is a Polish World War II television drama series, broadcast on TVP2 from 7 September 2008 to 23 November 2014, on STV Glasgow from 2 June 2014 and STV Edinburgh from 16 January 2015.

Plot
Set in German-occupied Poland 1939-1944 (series I, II, III, IV and VII) and in post-war Poland 1945-1946 (series V and VI), the series tells a story of Union of Armed Struggle/Armia Krajowa/Armed Forces Delegation for Poland soldiers commonly referred to as cichociemni. The script was inspired by the stories of Polish soldiers who during World War II underwent training in the UK in order to return to German-occupied Poland and partake in the underground struggle for independence. The series also touches upon the challenges faced by the German military intelligence organisation Abwehr, the intelligence agency of the SS Sicherheitsdienst des Reichsführers-SS (SD), the Nazi secret police commonly known as the Gestapo and the infiltration of the Union of Armed Struggle/Armia Krajowa by the Abwehr and the SD. The series also briefly covers the activities of the Soviet Main Intelligence Directorate (GRU) and the NKVD.

Until 2013 six series of 13 episodes each were made. Series I, II and III take place in the spring, summer and autumn of 1941. Series IV covers the period from April to June 1944. The action takes place mainly in Warsaw, including the Warsaw Ghetto, however some parts of the series are set in other areas of the General Government, as well as England, Italy and the Third Reich. Series V tells the story of the final period of World War II and shortly after its end, from April to June 1945, and is set in the newly instated People's Republic of Poland, Czechoslovakia and the American zone of the Allied-occupied West Germany. The action of series I to VI unfolds in the chronological order. Series VII, however, takes it back to 1944 and shows the events of the Warsaw Uprising, the 70th anniversary of which were celebrated in 2014.

Cast 
 Jan Wieczorkowski as Władek Konarski
 Antoni Pawlicki as Janek Markiewicz
 Maciej Zakościelny as Bronek Wojciechowski
 Jakub Wesołowski as Michał Konarski
 Krystian Wieczorek as Martin Halbe (series 1 to 3)
 Piotr Adamczyk as Lars Rainer (from series 2)
 Katarzyna Gniewkowska as Maria Konarska
 Jan Englert as Czesław Konarski (series 1)
 Robert Gonera as Aleksey Dykov (series 4)
 Maja Ostaszewska (series 1) and Magdalena Różczka (from series 2) as Wanda Ryszkowska
 Agnieszka Więdłocha as Lena Sajkowska
 Piotr Żurawski as Romek Sajkowski
 Krzysztof Globisz as Leon Sajkowski (series 1 to 3)
 Anna Romantowska as Sabina Sajkowska (series 1 to 3)
 Ewa Wencel as Helena
 Karolina Gorczyca as Wiktoria "Ruda" Rudnicka

Episodes
Series 1 Episode 1

Spring 1941. A small division of Polish soldiers are completing their training in England and are about to be parachuted back to occupied Poland in order to carry out sabotage actions against the Germans. The members of the division are: Czesław Konarski, major of the Polish Armed Forces; his two sons - Władek, sportsman and lieutenant of the Polish Armed Forces, and Michał, medical student; Jan Markiewicz, an architecture graduate from Praga in Warsaw, and Bronek Woyciechowski - before the war the only heir to the fortune of a Warsaw businessman. In the meantime the Gestapo are setting a trap...

Production

Reception
The series broadcast by Telewizja Polska enjoyed huge popularity in Poland and the licence to screen it has been purchased by broadcasters in Italy, China, Montenegro and Scotland.

References

External links

The series available to watch online for free at VOD.pl (in Polish) 
TVP Distribution - "Days of Honor"
Questions of honour, The Economist, Nov 18th 2010

2008 Polish television series debuts
Polish drama television series
World War II television drama series
Television shows set in Poland
Television series set in the 20th century
Military television series
2000s Polish television series
2010s Polish television series
2014 Polish television series endings
Telewizja Polska original programming